Patricius is a Palearctic genus of butterflies in the family Lycaenidae.

Species
Listed alphabetically:

 Patricius felicis (Oberthür, 1886) Tibet
 Patricius gaborronkayi (Bálint, 1997) Nepal, Tibet
 Patricius lucifera (Staudinger, 1867) Central Asia
 Patricius lucifuga (Fruhstorfer, 1915) Himalaya
 Patricius lucina (Grum-Grshimailo, 1902) China
 Patricius sagona Zhdanko, 2002 Tibet
 Patricius themis (Grum-Grshimailo, 1891) China 
 Patricius younghusbandi (Elwes, 1906) Tibet

References

External links

Polyommatini
Lycaenidae genera